Helga Matschkur (born 4 September 1943) is a German gymnast. She competed in six events at the 1968 Summer Olympics.

References

External links
 

1943 births
Living people
German female artistic gymnasts
Olympic gymnasts of West Germany
Gymnasts at the 1968 Summer Olympics
People from Ansbach
Sportspeople from Middle Franconia